Héctor Fernando Maseda Gutiérrez is a Cuban nuclear engineer and a journalist.

The Fidel Castro regime arrested him during the 2003 "Black Spring" and sentenced him to 20 years in jail. He was released in February, 2011. Amnesty International named him a prisoner of conscience and called for his immediate release. In 2008, he won an International Press Freedom Award from the Committee to Protect Journalists. The award is given for journalists who show courage in defending press freedom in the face of attacks, threats or imprisonment.

He was a nuclear engineer before being sacked at the end of the 1980s for ideological errors.

Héctor Maseda Gutiérrez was married to Laura Inés Pollán Toledo. Pollán Toledo was a founding member of the Ladies in White. She lost her job as a high school Spanish teacher in 2003. Laura Inés Pollán Toledo died on October 14, 2011.

In prison, Héctor Maseda Gutiérrez managed to write his memoirs, Enterrados Vivos (English: Buried Alive), which was smuggled out one page at time. His wife sent a copy to Fidel Castro. Upon his release in February, Meseda claimed that he was "released against his will," as he refused to leave jail unless he was exonerated or pardoned, along with the rest of the Black Spring prisoners.

References

External links

This is the testimony book in two parts Hector Maseda wrote while he was a prisoner:

Maseda, Hector: Enterrados Vivos - Part 1: http://www.solidaridadconcuba.com/documentos/EnterradosVivos%20-%20HMaseda.pdf

Maseda, Hector: Enterrados Vivos - Part 2: http://ebookbrowsee.net/gdoc.php?id=304808581&url=2ac324d3275756d585e72b44f96b2449

Amnesty International prisoners of conscience held by Cuba
Cuban dissidents
Cuban engineers
Cuban human rights activists
Cuban journalists
Male journalists
Cuban scientists
Living people
Nonviolence advocates
Nuclear engineers
Opposition to Fidel Castro
Cuban prisoners and detainees
Year of birth missing (living people)